Shaker Creek is a stream in the U.S. state of Ohio.

Shaker Creek was so named after the Shakers who settled near it. The area around Shaker Creek once formed a wetland called Shaker Swamp; the latter was drained and the land reclaimed.

References

Rivers of Butler County, Ohio
Rivers of Warren County, Ohio
Rivers of Ohio